is a Japanese video game designer and director working for Nintendo. He is best known for his contributions to the action-adventure game series The Legend of Zelda, for which he has served as planner, writer and director.

Career
Before he entered the video game industry, Fujibayashi had designed layouts of haunted attractions for Japanese theme parks. At that time, he had considered finding an occupation involving production, and came upon a job opening from a company that developed video games. He was fascinated with the fact that his application for employment had to include a sample of his work that would be inspected directly upon transmittal, and he became enamored with the idea of being a game designer. Fujibayashi eventually joined Capcom in 1995, where he gained experience as planner for the interactive movie Gakkō no Kowai Uwasa: Hanako-san ga Kita!! and the mahjong game Yōsuke Ide Meijin no Shin Jissen Maajan. Later, he became part of the company's Production Studio 1, and designed and directed the puzzle game Magical Tetris Challenge.

Fujibayashi's first involvement with the Zelda series was with the Game Boy Color games The Legend of Zelda: Oracle of Seasons and Oracle of Ages. In the initial development stages, he acted as sort of a clerk, who gathered all staff ideas and created presentations to propose the game concepts to producer Shigeru Miyamoto. Fujibayashi eventually became the director, participated as planner and scenario writer, and devised a system to link the two games for consecutive playthroughs. During his time at Capcom, he also directed and planned the Game Boy Advance games The Legend of Zelda: Four Swords and The Legend of Zelda: The Minish Cap. Following his switch to Nintendo, Fujibayashi became subdirector and story writer for the Nintendo DS game The Legend of Zelda: Phantom Hourglass. Afterward, he made his directorial debut for a home console Zelda with the Wii game The Legend of Zelda: Skyward Sword. He would later direct the Nintendo Switch and Wii U game The Legend of Zelda: Breath of the Wild. According to Fujibayashi, the most important aspect of game design is making the fundamental rule set of a video game absolutely clear to a player. He has a special fondness for the first Legend of Zelda, which he described as "novel" and "groundbreaking" for its time.

Works

References

External links

1972 births
Capcom people
Japanese video game designers
Japanese video game directors
Living people
Nintendo people